Sir John Desmond Todd  (12 February 1927 – 29 July 2015) was a New Zealand businessman and philanthropist who was head of the Todd Corporation.

His was educated at Wellesley College of which he was dux in 1943 (at that time Wellesley College had a secondary department). He later completed a degree in accountancy and commerce at Victoria University of Wellington.

Todd was a Founding trustee of the Arts Foundation of New Zealand, and served as a trustee for the Royal New Zealand Ballet and the Queen Elizabeth II Arts Council.

In 2011, Todd was inducted into the New Zealand Business Hall of Fame. He was made a Knight Companion of New Zealand Order of Merit in the 2012 New Year Honours, for services to business, having previously been appointed a Companion of New Zealand Order of Merit in the 2009 Queen's Birthday Honours.

References

1927 births
2015 deaths
People from Wellington City
Knights Companion of the New Zealand Order of Merit
New Zealand businesspeople
John
Victoria University of Wellington alumni
Businesspeople awarded knighthoods
Todd Corporation